Finery can refer to:
Finery, a hearth for a metallurgy process done in a finery forge
Finery (company), a British fashion label
Finery, expensive or ostentatious clothes.

See also
Fining (disambiguation)